V. Sekhar is an Indian film director and writer who works primarily in Tamil cinema.

Early life and Career
After completing B. A. and P. U. C., Sekar briefly worked as Malaria Eradication Worker at Corporation Health Department. On the insistence of B. Lenin, Sekar joined the film industry by assisting K. Bhagyaraj in films like Enga Chinna Raasa and Idhu Namma Aalu. He made his directorial debut with Neengalum Herothan (1990).

He has also worked with known comedian actors Goundamani, Senthil, Vivek and Vadivelu.

He began work on his latest venture in directing Saravana Poigai, starring his son Karl Marx in the lead role but the film remains unreleased. He was arrested on 12 August 2015, by the Idol Wing, Economic Offences Wing for suspected role in an idol smuggling racket.

Style of work 
Sekar has directed mainly family-themed drama films, and has been likened to Visu who does the same. He often produced his own films through the studio Thiruvalluvar Kalaikoodam alongside his business partner K. Parthiban.

Filmography

Director

Films

Television
Porantha Veeda Puguntha Veeda (Sun TV)
Veetukku Veedu (Raj TV)

Writer
Ponnu Pakka Poren (1989) (screenplay)

Actor
Pallikoodam (2007)
Enga Raasi Nalla Raasi (2009)

References

External links

Living people
Indian film directors
Tamil film directors
Tamil-language film directors
Film directors from Tamil Nadu
Year of birth missing (living people)
20th-century Indian film directors
21st-century Indian film directors